The 2012 San Francisco Board of Supervisors elections occurred on November 6, 2012. Six of the eleven seats of the San Francisco Board of Supervisors were contested in this election. One incumbent was termed out of office, four ran for reelection, and one ran for initial election after being appointed to the seat.

Municipal elections in California are officially non-partisan, though most candidates in San Francisco do receive funding and support from various political parties. The election was held using ranked-choice voting.

Results

District 1 

This district consists of the Richmond. Incumbent supervisor Eric Mar ran for reelection.

District 3 

District 3 consists of the northeastern corner of San Francisco, including Chinatown, the Financial District, Fisherman's Wharf, Nob Hill, North Beach, and Telegraph Hill. Incumbent supervisor David Chiu ran for reelection.

District 5 

District 5 consists of the Fillmore, Haight-Ashbury, Hayes Valley, Japantown, UCSF, and the Western Addition. Incumbent supervisor Christina Olague ran for her first election after being appointed by Mayor Ed Lee in the wake of Ross Mirkarimi's resignation to be Sheriff of San Francisco.

Ranked-choice vote distribution

District 7 

District 7 consists of City College, Forest Hill, Lake Merced, Mount Davidson, Parkmerced, San Francisco State University, St. Francis Wood, and Twin Peaks. Incumbent supervisor Sean Elsbernd was termed out of office.

Ranked-choice vote distribution

District 9 

District 9 consists of Bernal Heights, the Inner Mission, and the Portola. Incumbent supervisor David Campos ran for reelection.

District 11 

District 11 consists of Crocker-Amazon, the Excelsior, Ingleside, Oceanview, and the Outer Mission. Incumbent supervisor John Avalos ran for reelection unopposed.

References

External links 
City and County of San Francisco Department of Elections

San Francisco Board of Supervisors
Elections Board of Supervisors
San Francisco Board of Supervisors
Board of Supervisors 2012
2010s in San Francisco